Fussell is a surname. Notable people with the surname include:

 Aaron Fussell (1924–2014), American politician and educator
 Alexander Fussell (c. 1814–1881), English artist and illustrator
 Bartholomew Fussell (1794–1871), American abolitionist and early advocate of women's careers as physicians
 Betty Fussell (born 1927), American writer
 Charles Fussell (born 1938), American composer
 Charles Lewis Fussell, (1840–1909), American painter
 Chris Fussell (born 1976), American Major League Baseball pitcher
 Don Fussell, American computer scientist
 Edwin Sill Fussell (1922–2002), American writer
 Fred Fussell (1895–1966), American Major League Baseball pitcher
 Jacob Fussell (1819–1912), American manufacturer
 James Fussell IV (1748–1832), An iron magnate
 Paul Fussell (1924–2012), American cultural and literary historian
 Philip Fussell (born 1931), English cricketer
 Richard Fussell (born 1984), Welsh rugby union winger
 Sandy Fussell (born 1960), Australian author 
 Susan Fussell (1832–1889), educator, nurse in the United States Civil War, and philanthropist